Isser Zalman Meltzer (February 6, 1870 – November 17, 1953), was a Lithuanian Jewish and Belarusian Orthodox rabbi, rosh yeshiva and posek. He is also known as the "Even HaEzel"—the title of his commentary on Rambam's Mishneh Torah.

Early life
Rabbi Meltzer was born on 5 Adar 5630 (February 6, 1870) in the city of Mir, in the Minsk Governorate of the Russian Empire (present-day Republic of Belarus) to Rabbi Baruch Peretz
and Miriam Reisel Meltzer. From the age of 10, he studied with Rabbi Yom-Tov Lipman, the rabbi of the city, and at the Mir Yeshiva. In 1884, at the age of 14, he began studying at the Volozhin yeshiva under the Netziv and Rabbi Chaim Soloveitchik, where he remained for seven years.

While at the yeshiva, he became involved in the secret [Orthodox] Ness Ziona Society, part of the Hovevei Zion movement. Together with his brother-in-law, Rabbi Moshe Mordechai Epstein, he contributed to the founding of the city of Hadera by buying land for an etrog orchard.

In 1892, at age 22, he married Beila Hinda, daughter of R. Faivel Frank of Ilukste. During his engagement period, he studied at the Raduń Yeshiva with the Chofetz Chaim. During his studies, he contracted tuberculosis due to his roommate hanging animal skins in the room they were renting, and he was forced to return to his parents' home in Mir. His fiancee's family sent him money to pay for medical treatment while pressuring her to cancel the match. She refused, despite the pessimistic predictions of the doctors, and they married after he had recovered.

In 1894, Rabbi Melzer was appointed by Rav Nosson Tzvi Finkel as a maggid shiur at the Slabodka yeshiva, together with his brother-in-law, Rabbi Epstein. In 1897, Rabbi Meltzer left Slabodka to lead the Slutsk Yeshiva which had been established by the Ridvaz in Slutsk.

Later life
In 1903, Rabbi Meltzer was appointed as the Rabbi of Slutsk, a position he held for 20 years. Although he had already been serving as the rosh yeshiva in that city, he had no document of semicha because he had never planned on accepting a position in the rabbinate, but to teach Torah instead. 

When the communal leaders resolved to appoint him as their rabbi, Rabbi Meltzer wrote to his teacher Rabbi Chaim Soloveitchik and to Rabbi Yechiel Michel Epstein, author of the Arukh HaShulkhan, asking them to send him the necessary affirmation. Rabbi Epstein immediately mailed him a letter of semicha, while Rabbi Soloveitchik made do with a brief telegram that simply bore the words, "Yoreh yoreh, yodin yodin".

Rabbi Meltzer was also a disciple of the Chofetz Chaim and Rabbi Nosson Tzvi Finkel. He was the father-in-law of Rabbi Aharon Kotler and maternal grandfather of Rabbi Shneur Kotler. He and Rav Aharon fled from Russia to Poland
 at the outbreak of the outbreak of the Bolshevik revolution.

Rabbi Meltzer, who subsequently emigrated to Eretz Yisrael, was a friend and admirer of Rabbi Avraham Yitzhak Hacohen Kook, the chief rabbi of Israel and a self-avowed supporter of Zionism. Rabbi Meltzer once said to the famous sage Rabbi Chaim Ozer Grodzinsky of Vilna, “We are considered Torah giants only up until the point that we reach the door of Rabbi Kook’s room.”

In his later years, Rabbi Meltzer served as the rosh yeshiva of the Etz Chaim Yeshiva in Jerusalem. 

He died on Tuesday, 17 November 1953 (10th Kislev 5714) at age 83, exactly 20 years after his brother-in-law Rabbi Moshe Mordechai, and was interred on Har HaMenuchot in Jerusalem.

Students
The legacy of Rabbi Meltzer was carried on by his numerous students:

 His son, Rabbi Zvi Yehuda Meltzer, Chief Rabbi of Rehovot,  and the father-in-law of Rabbi Yehuda Amital
 His son, Rabbi Dr. Professor Feivel Meltzer was a noted linguist of Biblical Hebrew in Israel and contributor to the Da’at Miqra commentary on the Tanach
 His son-in-law, Rabbi Yitzchack Ben Menachem, Chief Rabbi of Petah Tikva
 His son-in-law, Rabbi Aharon Kotler, founder of Bais Medrash Gevoha in Lakewood, New Jersey
 His granddaughter's husband, Rabbi Yehuda Amital, rosh yeshiva of Yeshivat Har Etzion.
 Rabbi Shlomo Zalman Auerbach, rosh yeshiva of Kol Torah and leading posek of his time.
 Rabbi Yisroel Yaakov Fisher
 Rabbi Shlomo Goren, former Ashkenazi Chief Rabbi of Israel.
 Rabbi Yosef Eliyahu Henkin, founder of  Ezras Torah
 Rabbi Moshe Aharon Poleyeff, rosh yeshiva of Yeshiva University.
 Rabbi Elazar Shach, rosh yeshiva of Ponevezh Yeshiva in Israel, and leader of Lithuanian Jews
 Rabbi Avraham Yaakov Zelaznik, rosh yeshiva of Yeshiva Etz Chaim.
 Rabbi Shimon Zelaznik, (the above's brother) rosh yeshiva in Yeshivat Shaalvim
 Rabbi Amram Zaks, rosh yeshiva of the Slabodka yeshiva of Bnei Brak
 Rabbi Eliezer Waldenberg, leading 20th century posek on medicine and halacha; dayan in Jerusalem.
 Rabbi Isaac L. Swift
 Rabbi Avraham Shapira,  rosh yeshiva of Mercaz haRav Yeshiva in Jerusalem.

References

 Eckman, Lester: History of  Yeshivot and White Russia from their Beginnings Until 1945: publ Judaic Research institute, Elizabeth, New Jersey : p 253-259

1870 births
1953 deaths
People from Karelichy District
People from Novogrudsky Uyezd
Belarusian Haredi rabbis
Soviet emigrants to Mandatory Palestine
Israeli people of Belarusian-Jewish descent
Haredi rosh yeshivas
Moetzes Gedolei HaTorah
Haredi rabbis in Europe
Haredi rabbis in Israel
Burials at Har HaMenuchot
Academic staff of Slabodka yeshiva
People from Mir, Belarus
Mir Yeshiva alumni